Frank Adam (18 August 1968) is a Flemish author, mostly writing plays and philosophical works. He began writing in 1992 and is a member of the editorial team of the Dutch-language literary periodical De Brakke Hond and in addition, he is a teacher at the writers academy in Bruges.

Adam studied Arabic, Ancient Greek, Germanic languages, and literature.

Career
He began his writing career in 2001 with the book Waarom ik altijd née zeg ("Why I always say no") to answer his son Dante.  His 2002 book, Mijn mond eet graag spinazie maar ik niet ("My mouth eats spinach alright, but not me") looks through a child's eyes at the bizarre world of grown ups.  This book was also turned into a children's play. De passie van de puber ("The passion of a teenager") received the Knokke-Heist prize for best children's book of 2006.

Published works
Waarom ik altijd née zeg (2001,  Querido)
Mijn mond eet graag spinazie maar ik niet (2002,  Querido)
Vensters, uitzichten op poëzie en muziek (2002,  Davidsfonds/Infodok)
Het grote Zwinvoorleesboek (2004,  Davidsfonds/Infodok)
Wakitchaga : de dood is een jager (1992, De Geus) – children's play
Waterman (1993, De Geus) – Novel for adults
Sjirk, boek aan de Hebreeën (1999, De arbeiderspers) – Novel for adults
Wat de ezel zag / Klaas Verplancke (ill.) (2003, Davidsfonds/Infodok)
De passie van de puber (2006, Davidsfonds/Infodok)
De Caïro Cahiers (2007, Davidsfonds/Literair)
Confidenties aan een ezelsoor deel twee: De Wereld (2007, Davidsfonds/Infodok)
Als de bomen straks gaan rijden/ Milja Praagman (ill.) (2011, De Eenhoorn Bvba)

External links
Adam's website 
Interview   by Stadsomroep Brugge 

 

1968 births
Living people
Flemish writers
Writers from Bruges